To the Grave is the fifth studio album of the Danish heavy metal band Iron Fire. It was released through Napalm Records on 9 January 2009.

Track listing 
 "The Beast from the Blackness" - 4:50
 "Kill for Metal" - 4:11
 "The Demon Master" - 4:00
 "Cover the Sun" - 4:54
 "To the Grave" - 3:39
 "March of the Immortals" - 4:03
 "The Kingdom" - 4:24
 "Frozen in Time" - 5:26
 "Hail to Odin" - 4:59
 "Doom Riders" - 5:41
 "Ghost of Vengeance" - 4:26
 "The Battlefield" - 5:09

Tracks 1,2,5,6,7,9 & 11 written by: Martin Steene
Tracks 3,4,8,10 & 12 written by: Martin Steene & Kirk Backarach

Album line-up 
Martin Steene -  Lead & Backing vocals
Kirk Backarach - Guitars & Backing vocals
Martin Lund - Bass & Backing vocals
Fritz Wagner - Drums & Backing vocals

Guest musicians
Danny Svendsen - Keyboards & backing vocals
Ivan Grosmeyer - Backing vocals
Dion Wind - Backing vocals
Dennis Munkebæk - Backing vocals
Jesper Brogaard - Backing vocals
Gunnar Olsen - Backing vocals
Kristian Iversen - Backing vocals
Morten Bryld - Backing vocals
Turtle - Backing vocals

References

External links
Official Iron Fire-homepage

2009 albums
Iron Fire albums
Napalm Records albums